Garcinia brevipedicellata is a species of flowering plant in the family Clusiaceae. It is found in Cameroon and Nigeria. It is threatened by habitat loss.

References

Flora of Cameroon
Flora of Nigeria
Vulnerable plants
brevipedicellata
Taxonomy articles created by Polbot